Sean Mallan McInerney (born December 27, 1960) is a former American football defensive end who played for the Chicago Bears of the National Football League (NFL). He was a union line jumper during the NFL strike in 1987.  The “spare bears” as they were called were cut as soon as the NFL players strike was over.  He played college football at Frostburg State University.

References 

Living people
Frostburg State Bobcats football players
1960 births
American football defensive ends
Chicago Bears players